Komarovsky is a closed rural locality (a settlement) in Orenburg Oblast, Russia. Population:

History
Komarovsky was granted urban-type settlement status in 1994. However, the law on the administrative-territorial division of Orenburg Oblast, passed in July 2007 and currently in effect, no longer provides for such a status, making the settlement classified as rural. Nevertheless, some of the more recent sources, such as, for example, the results of the 2010 Census, continue listing Komarovsky under the urban-type settlement designation.

Administrative and municipal status
Within the framework of administrative divisions, it is incorporated as the closed administrative-territorial formation of Komarovsky—an administrative unit with the status equal to that of the districts. As a municipal division, the closed administrative-territorial formation of Komarovsky is incorporated as Komarovsky Urban Okrug.

References

Notes

Sources

Rural localities in Orenburg Oblast
Closed cities